Pine Mountain State Resort Park is a Kentucky state park located in Bell County, southeastern Kentucky, United States. Located on part of the Pine Mountain ridge in the Appalachians, the park opened in 1924 as Kentucky's first state park. 

Each spring since 1933, the park has hosted the annual Kentucky Mountain Laurel Festival.  A portion of the park is legally dedicated as a nature preserve by the Office of Kentucky Nature Preserves.

History
When Pine Mountain State Resort Park was established in 1926, it was named Cumberland State Park. The name was changed in 1938 in order to avoid confusion with the newly formed Cumberland Falls State Resort Park. During the park's early years, there was little development. In 1933, during the Great Depression, President Franklin D. Roosevelt assigned the Civilian Conservation Corps to numerous infrastructure projects. At this park, they began constructing the main office building, cabins, roads, bridges, shelters, and hiking trails, creating a resource for all the citizens.

In the 1960s, the Kentucky State Park System began updating their parks. For Pine Mountain State Park, they constructed a new wing to the lodge, adding 30 more guest rooms; they also built 10 additional cottages, a swimming pool, and a golf course. Today, the park serves as one of southeastern Kentucky's premier state parks.

Amenities and recreation
Herndon J. Evans Lodge - The lodge has 30 guest rooms.
Mountain View Restaurant - seats 125 people and has a private dining area that seats 25 people.
Wasioto Winds Golf Course - This 18-hole golf course was ranked fourth in the nation by Golf Digest Magazine in January 2003 as among the Best New Affordable Public Golf Courses.
Cottages - The park has nine one-bedroom cabins that were built by the CCC in the 1930s. It also has eleven modern, two-bedroom cabins, built in the 1970s.
Chained Rock - During the 1930s, the people of Pineville, Kentucky decided to create a new tourist attraction. In 1933, a group of people hauled a 101-foot-long chain to the top of Pine Mountain and attached it to a massive boulder that loomed above the town. They said the rock was chained to the mountain in order to keep it from rolling down the mountain and destroying the city.
Other attractions -  Miniature golf, swimming, hiking, Ray Harm artworks (displayed throughout the lodge, restaurant, and convention center), interpretive center, playgrounds, picnicking, and gift shop (at the front desk).

Events
Elk Viewing Tours - (January, September–December)
Kentucky Writers Workshop - (March)
Kentucky Mountain Laurel Festival - (May)
Great American Dulcimer Convention - (September)

References

External links

 Pine Mountain State Resort Park at Kentucky Department of Parks
 Pine Mountain State Resort Park at American Byways
 U.S. Geological Survey Map at the U.S. Geological Survey Map Website. Retrieved January 12, 2023.

Protected areas of Bell County, Kentucky
State parks of Kentucky
Civilian Conservation Corps in Kentucky
Protected areas established in 1924
Nature centers in Kentucky